Ecsenius lineatus, known commonly as the linear blenny or lined combtooth blenny, is a species of marine fish in the family Blenniidae.

The linear blenny is widespread throughout the tropical waters of the Indo-West Pacific area and particularly from the eastern coast of Africa to the Philippines.

It grows to a size of 8 cm in length.

References

External links
http://www.marinespecies.org/aphia.php?p=taxdetails&id=219272
fran.cornu.free.fr/affichage/affichage_nom.php?id_espece=1423
 

lineatus
Taxa named by Wolfgang Klausewitz
Fish described in 1962